Leptobrachium gunungense (also known as the Asian litter frog) is a species of amphibian in the family Megophryidae. It is endemic to Malaysia. Its natural habitats are subtropical or tropical moist montane forests and rivers.

References

gunungense
Taxonomy articles created by Polbot
Amphibians described in 1996